The Rosario Group is a Late Cretaceous geologic group in southwestern California (United States) and northwestern Baja California (Mexico). In older literature it was named Rosario Formation.

The Cretaceous aged formations of the Rosario Group include the Point Loma Formation, Cabrillo Formation and Lusardi Formation, in ascending order.

The sedimentary structures of the Rosario Group apparently were formed in a nearshore shelf environment, probably a local embayment.

Fossils 
Some incomplete dinosaur fossils have been discovered in the Point Loma Formation dating back to the Cretaceous period of the Mesozoic Era.

See also 

 
 List of fossiliferous stratigraphic units in California

References

Further reading 
 JSTOR.org: "Dynamics of Late Cretaceous Rocky Shores (Rosario Formation) from Baja California, Mexico"; by Halard L. Lescinsky, Jorge Ledesma-Vázquez and Markes E. Johnson; SEPM Society for Sedimentary Geology; PALAIOS, Vol. 6, No. 2 (Apr., 1991), pp. 126–141.
  SDSU.edu:  "Paleocurrent analysis of the Cretaceous Rosario Formation"; Bailey, Stephen Milton; 1966-08-10.

Geologic groups of California
Geologic groups of North America
Geologic formations of Mexico
Cretaceous California
Cretaceous Mexico
Upper Cretaceous Series of North America
Geology of San Diego County, California
Geography of San Diego
Natural history of Baja California